Baghelkhand is a region and a mountain range in central India.

Baghel may also refer to:

People

Surname
 Dayaldas Baghel, Indian politician from Bharatiya Janata Party
 Pratibha Baghel, Indian film singer
 Ranjana Baghel, Indian politician from the Bharatiya Janata Party
 S. P. Singh Baghel, Indian politician from the Bharatiya Janata Party
 Sarika Devendra Singh Baghel, Indian politician from Rashtriya Lok Dal and Samajwadi Party
 Surendra Singh Baghel, Indian politician from Indian National Congress

Given name
 Baghel Singh, an 18th-century military general of the Sikh Empire of present-day India and Pakistan

See also 
 Ahirauli Baghel, a village in India
 Bagel (disambiguation)
 Mahalleh-ye Baghel, a village in Iran
 Vaghela (disambiguation)